Henriette Marie or Henrietta Maria may refer to:

 Henriette Marie of France (1609–1669), Queen of England, Scotland, and Ireland as the wife of Charles I
 Henriette Marie of the Palatinate (1626–1651), German noblewoman
 Henrietta Marrie (born 1954), Australian indigenous rights activist
 Henrietta Marie, a slave ship

See also 
 Marie Henriette (disambiguation)